Brendha Prata Haddad (April 12, 1986 in Rio Branco, Acre) is a Brazilian actress.

At 3 years, she was paraded in the capital of Acre. At 12, she won the Miss Brazil Child, Paraná. Although now want to pursue an acting career at an early age, his father, a doctor Eduardo Haddad, caused her to postpone the start of his career. In 2006, now studying at the Faculty of Law, Brendha did the tests in his hometown for the miniseries Amazônia, de Galvez a Chico Mendes, shown in 2007. And that's when she got her first role, Ritinha.

Career

Television

Films

References

External links 

1986 births
Living people
People from Rio Branco, Acre
Brazilian telenovela actresses
Brazilian stage actresses